Kennedy Ugoala Nwanganga (born 15 August 1990) is a Nigerian footballer, who is currently playing for Beringen.

Career
The Veikkausliiga champions FC Inter Turku have signed Nwanganga, from NAF Rockets FC. In the 2010 season he was his team's second best goalscorer with 7 goals (four behind  Henri Lehtonen).

On 14 November 2010, he signed a three and a half year contract with K.R.C. Genk.

In that half season he got a few chances and eventually clinched the championship for Genk with an equalising header against Standard in the final game of the 2010-11 playoff.

On 4 April 2016, Nwanganga signed a one-year contract with FC Inter Turku.

Honours
Belgian Pro League: 2010–11
Belgian Super Cup: 2011

External links
 Inter Turku Profile
 K.R.C. Genk Profile

References

1990 births
Living people
Nigerian footballers
Nigerian expatriate footballers
Association football midfielders
Enyimba F.C. players
FC Inter Turku players
Heartland F.C. players
K.R.C. Genk players
Beerschot A.C. players
K.V.C. Westerlo players
Nigerian expatriate sportspeople in Finland
Veikkausliiga players
Belgian Pro League players
Challenger Pro League players
Expatriate footballers in Albania
Expatriate footballers in Belgium
Expatriate footballers in Finland
People from Aba, Abia
NAF Rockets F.C. players